Lee Sang-hui (born 30 June 1970) is a South Korean sports shooter. She competed in the women's double trap event at the 1996 Summer Olympics.

References

External links
 

1970 births
Living people
South Korean female sport shooters
Olympic shooters of South Korea
Shooters at the 1996 Summer Olympics
Place of birth missing (living people)
Asian Games gold medalists for South Korea
Asian Games silver medalists for South Korea
Asian Games medalists in shooting
Shooters at the 1998 Asian Games
Shooters at the 2002 Asian Games
Medalists at the 1998 Asian Games
Medalists at the 2002 Asian Games
20th-century South Korean women
21st-century South Korean women